Acanthocladus is a genus in the family Polygalaceae that is native to South America.

Species
Acanthocladus brasiliensis (A.St.-Hil. & Moq.) Klotzsch ex Hassk.
Acanthocladus colombianus Aymard & J.F.B.Pastore
Acanthocladus dichromus (Steud.) J.F.B.Pastore
Acanthocladus dukei (Barringer) J.F.B.Pastore & D.B.O.S.Cardoso
Acanthocladus guayaquilensis B.Eriksen & B.Ståhl
Acanthocladus moyanoi Speg.
Acanthocladus pulcherrimus (Kuhlm.) J.F.B.Pastore & D.B.O.S.Cardoso
Acanthocladus santosii (Wurdack) J.F.B.Pastore & D.B.O.S.Cardoso
Acanthocladus scleroxylon (Ducke) B.Eriksen & B.Ståhl
Acanthocladus tehuelchum Speg.

References

Polygalaceae
Fabales genera